Anneke Beerten (born 7 July 1982) is a Dutch Mountain bike racer and BMX racer. Specializing in Four-cross she was world champion in this discipline in 2011, 2012, 2015, and 2016.

Life 
Beerten was born in 1982 in Mariënvelde and she was riding a mountain bike at age four.

She has competed regularly each year as an amateur. She gave up work in retail when she was 22 to become a full time four-cross cyclist. She won the world championships in 2011 and 2012 and she has topped the rankings every year bar one from 2007 to 2011.

Results

References

External links
 
 
 

1982 births
Living people
BMX riders
Dutch female cyclists
Dutch mountain bikers
Cyclists from Oost Gelre
21st-century Dutch women